Guy Nolan Daly (4 September 1908 – 29 September 1991) was an English cricketer.  Daly was a right-handed batsman who bowled right-arm medium pace.  He was born in Bramley, Hampshire.  He was known in some sources as Guy Nolan O'Daly.

Daly made a single first-class appearance for Glamorgan against Cambridge University in 1938.  In this match, he scored 9 runs in Glamorgan's first-innings, before being dismissed by Bertram Carris.  He bowled 7 overs in the Cambridge University first-innings, after which he was injured and played no further part in the match with the ball.  He did not bat in Glamorgan's second-innings.  He made no further appearances for Glamorgan.

He died in Basingstoke, Hampshire on 29 September 1991.

References

External links
Guy Daly at ESPNcricinfo
Guy Daly at CricketArchive

1908 births
1991 deaths
People from Bramley, Hampshire
English cricketers
Glamorgan cricketers